Hydnellum glaucopus is a species of tooth fungus in the family Bankeraceae. Found in Europe, it was described as new to science in 1969 by mycologists Rudolph Arnold Maas Geesteranus and John Axel Nannfeldt. Fruit bodies contain cyathane diterpenes called glaucopins that have anti-inflammatory activity in laboratory tests. It is considered vulnerable in Switzerland.

References

External links

Fungi described in 1969
Fungi of Europe
glaucopus